1950 in Sports describes the year's events in world sport.
Popular sports during the 1950s were badminton and soccer.  Also, 1950 was a huge year for horse racing – horse racing tripled in spectators and prize pools increased.

American football
 NFL Championship: the Cleveland Browns won 30–28 over the Los Angeles Rams at Cleveland Stadium
 Coaches Poll established to rank top 20 American college football teams

Association football
FIFA World Cup
 1950 World Cup held in Brazil. Uruguay are the winners after beating Brazil in the final group decider.
 United States defeats England 1–0 in one of the great upsets in sports history
England
 First Division – Portsmouth win the 1949–50 title.
 FA Cup – Arsenal beat Liverpool 2–0.
France
 Olympique Lyonnais, officially rename from Lyon Olympique on August 3.

Athletics
The 4th European Athletics Championships were held from 23 August to 27 August at the Heysel Stadium in Brussels.

Australian rules football
The Victorian Football Association began playing as an affiliated member of the Australian National Football Council and playing under the same rules as the rest of the country. This ended a decade-long schism which had begun in 1938, during which the VFA had played under its own rival set of rules under which throwing the football in general play was legalised.
 Victorian Football League
 Essendon wins the 54th VFL Premiership (Essendon 13.14 (92) d North Melbourne 7.12 (54))
 Brownlow Medal awarded to Allan Ruthven (Fitzroy)

Baseball
 The Japanese Baseball League is reorganized, creating the modern Nippon Professional Baseball.
 World Series – The New York Yankees sweep the Philadelphia Phillies four games to none.
 Japan Series – In the inaugural Japan Series, the Mainichi Orions defeat the Shochiku Robins 4 games to 2.

Basketball
NBA Finals 
Minneapolis Lakers win four games to two over the Syracuse Nats

Boxing
 January – Joey Maxim wins the light-heavyweight world title, stopping champion Freddie Mills in 10 rounds.
 September 27 – Ezzard Charles retains his World Heavyweight Championship with a 15-round unanimous decision over Joe Louis in New York City.

Canadian football
 Grey Cup – Toronto Argonauts win 13–0 over the Winnipeg Blue Bombers

Cycling
 Giro d'Italia – Hugo Koblet of Switzerland
 Tour de France – Ferdinand Kubler of Switzerland
 Vuelta a España – Emilio Rodriguez of Spain
 UCI Road World Championships – Men's road race – Briek Schotte of Belgium

Figure skating
 World Figure Skating Championships –
 Men's champion: Dick Button, United States
 Ladies' champion: Aja Zanova, Czechoslovakia
 Pairs skating champions: Karol Kennedy & Michael Kennedy, United States

Golf
Men's professional
 Masters Tournament – Jimmy Demaret
 U.S. Open – Ben Hogan
 PGA Championship – Chandler Harper
 British Open – Bobby Locke
 PGA Tour money leader – Sam Snead – $35,759
Men's amateur
 British Amateur – Frank Stranahan
 U.S. Amateur – Sam Urzetta
Women's professional
 Thirteen women golfers found the Ladies Professional Golf Association (LPGA).
 Women's Western Open – Babe Zaharias
 U.S. Women's Open – Babe Zaharias
 Titleholders Championship – Babe Zaharias
 Babe Zaharias named Woman Athlete of the Half–Century by the Associated Press.
 LPGA Tour money leader – Babe Zaharias  – $14,800

Harness racing
 Little Brown Jug for pacers – Dudley Hanover
 Hambletonian for trotters – Lusty Song
 Australian Inter Dominion Harness Racing Championship for pacers – Captain Sandy

Horse racing
 The United States National Museum of Racing and Hall of Fame is founded in Saratoga Springs, New York.
Steeplechases
 Cheltenham Gold Cup – Cottage Rake for the third successive year
 Grand National – Freebooter
Hurdle races
 Champion Hurdle – Hatton's Grace
Flat races
 Australia – Melbourne Cup won by Comic Court
 Canada – King's Plate won by McGill
 France – Prix de l'Arc de Triomphe won by Tantieme
 Ireland – Irish Derby won by Dark Warrior
 English Triple Crown Races:
 2,000 Guineas Stakes – Palestine
 The Derby – Galcador
 St. Leger Stakes  – Scratch
 United States Triple Crown Races:
 Kentucky Derby – Middleground
 Preakness Stakes – Hill Prince
 Belmont Stakes – Middleground

Ice hockey
 Art Ross Trophy as the NHL's leading scorer during the regular season: Ted Lindsay, Detroit Red Wings
 Hart Memorial Trophy – for the NHL's Most Valuable Player: Charlie Rayner, New York Rangers
 Stanley Cup – Detroit Red Wings win 4 games to 3 over the New York Rangers
 World Hockey Championship
 Men's champion: Canada's Edmonton Mercurys
 NCAA Men's Ice Hockey Championship – Colorado College Tigers defeat Boston University Terriers 13–4 in Colorado Springs, Colorado

Motorsport

Nordic skiing
FIS Nordic World Ski Championships
 13th FIS Nordic World Ski Championships 1950 are held in the United States at Lake Placid (ski jumping) and Rumford, Maine (cross-country skiing).  These are the first world championships since 1939.

Rowing
The Boat Race
 1 April — Cambridge wins the 96th Oxford and Cambridge Boat Race

Rugby league
Australia
1950 NSWRFL season

England
1949–50 Northern Rugby Football League season/1950–51 Northern Rugby Football League season

Rugby union
Five Nations Championship
 56th Five Nations Championship series is won by Wales who complete the Grand Slam

Snooker
 World Snooker Championship – Walter Donaldson beats Fred Davis 51–46.

Speed skating
Speed Skating World Championships
 Men's All-round Champion – Hjalmar Andersen (Norway)
 Women's All-round Champion – Maria Isakova (USSR)

Tennis
Australia
 Australian Men's Singles Championship – Frank Sedgman (Australia) defeats Ken McGregor (Australia) 6–3, 6–4, 4–6, 6–1
 Australian Women's Singles Championship – Louise Brough (USA) defeats Doris Hart (USA) 6–4, 3–6, 6–4
England
 Wimbledon Men's Singles Championship – Budge Patty (USA) defeats Frank Sedgman (Australia) 6–1, 8–10, 6–2, 6–3
 Wimbledon Women's Singles Championship – Louise Brough Clapp (USA) defeats Margaret Osborne duPont (USA) 6–1, 3–6, 6–1 
France
 French Men's Singles Championship –  Budge Patty
 French Women's Singles Championship – Doris Hart
USA
 American Men's Singles Championship – Arthur Larsen
 American Women's Singles Championship – Margaret Osborne duPont 
Davis Cup
 1950 Davis Cup –  4–1  at West Side Tennis Club (grass) New York City, United States

Multi-sport events
 4th British Empire Games held in Auckland, New Zealand

References

 
Sports by year